1994 Emmy Awards may refer to:

 46th Primetime Emmy Awards, the 1994 Emmy Awards ceremony honoring primetime programming
 21st Daytime Emmy Awards, the 1994 Emmy Awards ceremony honoring daytime programming
 22nd International Emmy Awards, the 1994 Emmy Awards ceremony honoring international programming

Emmy Award ceremonies by year